The European Para-Archery Championships is a competition for European disabled archers.

Editions

Medal table

Results

2010 (Vichy)

2014 (Nottwil)
129 archers from 24 countries participated.

2016 (Saint-Jean-de-Monts)

2018 (Pilsen)
126 archers from 27 nations competed.

See also
European Archery Championships
World Para Archery Championships

References

International archery competitions
Archery competitions in Europe
Recurring sporting events established in 2006